José María Pagoaga Larrañaga (Mutriku, 11 November 1951 - Donostia, 29 June 1995) was a former Basque handball player who competed in the 1980 Summer Olympics for Spain. In 1980, he finished fifth with the Spanish team in the Olympic tournament. He played all six matches as goalkeeper.

References

1951 births
1995 deaths
Spanish male handball players
Olympic handball players of Spain
Handball players at the 1980 Summer Olympics
People from Debabarrena
BM Granollers players
Sportspeople from Gipuzkoa
Handball players from the Basque Country (autonomous community)